Mr. Robert Quimby is the father of Beezus, Ramona, and Roberta Quimby from the Ramona series of children's books by Beverly Cleary.

Fictional character personality
Mr. Quimby is a patient, affectionate, and humorous father who is a talented artist and likes to dole out wisdom from his grandmother.  He is known in his family as a mediocre cook, even though his pancakes turn out well.

Fictional character biography
When Mr. Quimby was young, his grandmother regularly bought him paper to draw on.  He later drew cartoons for his school's newspaper.  Mr. Quimby had to quit college when he and his wife, Dorothy, had Beezus.  In Beezus and Ramona, Mr. Quimby had been employed by the Pacific Gas and Electric Company.
In Ramona and Her Father, Mr. Quimby had worked for a small van-and-storage company, but lost his job when a large company bought it.  He had trouble finding work until he got a job as a cashier at the local ShopRite grocery store.  He didn't like the job and ended up returning to college to get his degree so he could be an art teacher.
When he got his teaching certificate, he couldn't find a job as an art teacher, so he returned to work at ShopRite, where he was promoted to manager.  It is clear to everyone in the neighborhood, that a lot of Ramona's imagination and artistic ability came from her father; and that she is most definitely her father's girl.

References

External links
The World Of Beverly Cleary 

Beverly Cleary characters
Male characters in literature
Literary characters introduced in 1955